Defending champion William Larned defeated Reginald Doherty in the Challenge Round, 4–6, 6–2, 6–4, 8–6 to win the men's singles tennis title at the 1902 U.S. National Championships. The event was held at the Newport Casino in Newport, R.I., USA. Doherty had defeated Malcolm Whitman in the All Comers' Final.

Draw

Challenge round

All Comers' finals

Earlier rounds

Section 1

Section 2

Section 3

Section 4

Section 5

Section 6

Section 7

Section 8

References

 

Men's Singles
1902